The 2013 PGA Tour Latinoamérica was the second season of PGA Tour Latinoamérica, having converted from the Tour de las Américas which ceased to operate in 2012. PGA Tour Latinoamérica is operated and run by the PGA Tour.

It was the first season in which the Developmental Series was introduced.

Schedule changes
The 2013 season was the first full season on the tour with the 2012 season having only operated for four months in 2012. The 2013 schedule was divided into two distinct swings, the first with events played from March through May, followed by the remainder of events in the October through December. The number of events increased from 11 in 2012 to 14 with, new events for the 2013 season were, Abierto Mexicano de Golf, Abierto del Centro and Abierto de Chile.

Schedule
The following table lists official events during the 2013 season.

Order of Merit
The Order of Merit was based on prize money won during the season, calculated in U.S. dollars. The top five players on the tour earned status to play on the 2014 Web.com Tour.

Developmental Series
The following table lists Developmental Series events during the 2013 season.

See also
2013 in golf

Notes

References

PGA Tour Latinoamérica
PGA Tour Latinoamerica